The 43rd César Awards ceremony, presented by the Académie des Arts et Techniques du Cinéma, took place on 2 March 2018, at the Salle Pleyel in Paris to honour the best French films of 2017.

Winners and nominees

See also
 23rd Lumières Awards
 8th Magritte Awards
 30th European Film Awards
 90th Academy Awards
 71st British Academy Film Awards

References

External links

 Official website

2018 film awards
2018 in French cinema
2018
March 2018 events in France